The 1941 Kilkenny Senior Hurling Championship was the 47th staging of the Kilkenny Senior Hurling Championship since its establishment by the Kilkenny County Board.

On 13 December 1941, Carrickshock won the championship after a 4-05 to 3-07 defeat of Éire Óg in the final. It was their fourth championship title overall and their second title in succession.

Results

Semi-finals

Final

References

Kilkenny Senior Hurling Championship
Kilkenny Senior Hurling Championship